The Plaza del sí was a demonstration held in Argentina on April 6, 1990, at the Plaza de Mayo. It was called by journalist Bernardo Neustad, and asked for the support to then president Carlos Menem. It was attended by 80,000 people. People attended the demonstration without political banners. Menem made a brief speech, and asked for national unity.

References

Presidency of Carlos Menem
1990 in Argentina
Protests in Argentina